Aomen, also known as Aomoen, is an island twelve kilometers northwest of Bikini Island, Bikini Atoll, Marshall Islands. The portion of the island covered by vegetation is approximately 93,078 m2 in area. The ruins of a concrete bunker constructed during the nuclear tests at the atoll is located on the southern tip of the island.

References

Bikini Atoll